Carabus jedompansis is a species of black-coloured beetle from family Carabidae.

References

jedompansis
Beetles described in 1990